Village Number 1, also known as The Village and Nitrate Plant Number 1 Reservation Subdivision, is an unincorporated community in Colbert County, Alabama, in the United States.

History
In 1916, President Woodrow Wilson signed the National Defense Act, which authorized the construction of two nitrate-manufacturing plants and a dam to provide them hydropower.  President Wilson chose Muscle Shoals, Alabama as the site of the dam, which when completed in 1924, was named Wilson Dam. The new plant would produce ammonium nitrate using the Haber process. It was soon discovered the Haber process would not produce the amount of nitrate needed, so another plant was built that employed the cyanamide process.

The New York City architect, Harold Caparn, who helped expand the Brooklyn Botanic Garden, was chosen as chief architect of an industrial village that would house supervisors and workers for the Nitrate Plant No. 1. Construction of the village began in the latter half of 1918. The village was designed in the pattern of a handbell, with houses surrounding the handle, body, and clapper, and a school at the base. At its completion, the village contained 112 residential structures, 2 school buildings, and one large apartment building that housed unmarried officers. Maud Lindsay, a nationally known writer of children's books, was chosen as the first kindergarten teacher at the school.

World War I ended on November 11, 1918, and with it, the production of ammonium nitrate was no longer needed. The plant was closed, and the newly built houses stood unoccupied. In 1921, Henry Ford offered to buy the plants and village with plans to develop it into an industrial complex. Until 1933, only a small number of the houses were occupied, all by Alabama Power Company workers. Senator George W. Norris thought the site should be utilized for public use, and in May 1933, President Franklin D. Roosevelt formed the Tennessee Valley Authority. The industrial complex would be used for fertilizer production and as a development center. In 1949, the streets, playgrounds, and school were deeded to the city of Sheffield by the TVA and the houses were auctioned to the public.

See also
List of National Historic Landmarks in Alabama
National Register of Historic Places listings in Colbert County, Alabama

External links

References

National Register of Historic Places in Colbert County, Alabama
Florence–Muscle Shoals metropolitan area
National Historic Landmarks in Alabama
Historic districts in Colbert County, Alabama
Unincorporated communities in Colbert County, Alabama
Historic American Engineering Record in Alabama
Historic districts on the National Register of Historic Places in Alabama
Company towns in Alabama
Unincorporated communities in Alabama